Mariam Metwally (born May 1, 1999) is an  Egyptian female volleyball player, a member of the Egypt women's national volleyball team.
She started playing volleyball in Al Ahly Women's Volleyball since she was 7 years old. Mariam joined the Egyptian national team at the age of 16 in 2015 FIVB Volleyball Girls' U18 World Championship in Peru

Club career
Metwally is playing for Al Ahly Volleyball Club sice she was 7 years old. She participated for the first time with the senior team  of the club in 2015 Women's African Clubs Championship (volleyball) held in Egypt. Al Ahly won in the 1st place and Mariam MVP Honors and Best Blocker.

Awards

Individual
Women's African Clubs Championship (volleyball), 2015 Most Valuable Player and Best Blocker
Women's Arab volleyball clubs championship 2019, Best  Blocker

Clubs
 CAVB Championship 2016 –  Champion, with Al Ahly
 CAVB Championship 2015 –  Champion, with Al Ahly
 Women's Arab volleyball clubs championship 2015 –  Champion, with Al Ahly
 Women's Arab volleyball clubs championship 2016 –  Champion, with Al Ahly
 CAVB Championship 2018 –  Champion, with Al Ahly
 CAVB Championship 2019 –  Champion, with Al Ahly
 Women's Arab volleyball clubs championship 2019 –  Silver medal, with Al Ahly

References 

1999 births
Living people
Egyptian women's volleyball players